The BHP Whyalla DE class are a class of diesel locomotives built by Clyde Engineering, Granville for BHP between 1956 and 1965.

History
In 1956, BHP purchased two Electro-Motive Diesel G8 locomotives from Clyde Engineering for use at its narrow gauge Iron Knob iron-ore quarry.

In 1956, the first of four larger Electro-Motive Diesel G12 locomotives was delivered from Clyde Engineering for use on the narrow gauge BHP Whyalla Tramway, a fifth was delivered in June 1961.

Following the construction of the 39.5 kilometre Coffin Bay Tramway standard gauge line between Proper Bay and Coffin Bay on the Eyre Peninsula, two standard gauge G12s were purchased in 1965. Following the quarry railway being closed in 1968, the G8s were both transferred to the standard gauge railway.

Between 1993 and 1995, six were remanufactured by Morrison-Knudsen Australia, at its Whyalla factory, receiving new cabs.

In 2003, the Whyalla Steelworks became part of OneSteel and the rail operations transferred to Australian Railroad Group. The DEs were renumbered as the 1250 and 1300 classes. With the split up of Australian Railroad Group in 2006, the remaining five DE class transferred to Genesee & Wyoming Australia.

During the 1990s remanufacturing program, DE02 had been stripped as a source of parts. In 2005-2006 it was rebuilt at Islington Railway Workshops for SCT Logistics for use in Parkes. As it was very similar to the Victorian Railways T class, it was renumbered T414.

Status table

References

External links
Rail Gallery

BHP Billiton diesel locomotives
Bo-Bo locomotives
Clyde Engineering locomotives
Diesel-electric locomotives of Australia
Railway locomotives introduced in 1956
3 ft 6 in gauge locomotives of Australia